Puerto Alfonso López is a small town and municipality in the Orinoquía Region (Llanos region) of Meta Department, Colombia. It is known as Puerto López and is a port on the Meta river. The town is located approximately 100 kilometers east of the town of Villavicencio. Its main industries are agriculture and cattle. 

Puerto Lopez has been said to be the "belly button", or geographical center, of Colombia. Nearby is the Obelisco del Alto de Menegua, a 30 meter tall obelisk that marks the intersection of 4 degrees north latitude and 72 degrees west longitude.

History
The town was established on 1 May 1935. It was centered on the river port and pre-existing village. On 3 May 1937, the Intendencia for Meta Department ordered the creation of the Yacuana District (corregimiento) whose capital is Puerto Alfonso Lopez. The municipality was established on 3 July 1955, in accordance with National Decree No. 2543 of 1945.

Notes

External links
 Puerto Lopez official website

Municipalities of Meta Department